Lee Hyung-chul  (born December 13, 1969, in Gimje,  South Korea) is a South Korean former professional boxer who competed from 1987 to 1996. He won the World Boxing Association super flyweight title in 1994.

Professional career

Lee turned professional in 1987 and compiled a record of 17-4 before facing and defeating Japanese boxer Katsuya Onizuka, to win the WBA Super flyweight title. He would defend the title against another Japanese boxer Tomonori Tamura in his next fight He would lose go on to lose the title to Venezuelan contender Alimi Goitia. He would unsuccessfully rematch Goitia seven months later this time losing via 12 round stoppage, he retired shortly after the fight.

Professional boxing record

See also
List of Korean boxers
List of world super-flyweight boxing champions

References

External links

 

|-

1969 births
Living people
South Korean male boxers
People from Gimje
Super-flyweight boxers
World super-flyweight boxing champions
World Boxing Association champions